Rodrigo Montoya (born June 4, 1996) is a Mexican racquetball player. He is the current International Racquetball Federation (IRF) World Champion in Team Competition and Mixed Doubles, winning the title with Samantha Salas in the 2022 Championships in San Luis Potosi, Mexico. That was his 4th IRF World Championship, as he won the 2018 Men’s Singles in Costa Rica and the 2021 Men's Doubles with Javier Mar in Guatemala City. He is also the current Pan American Games champion in both Men’s Singles and Doubles with Mar, winning those events at the 2019 Pan Am Games in Lima. Montoya and Samantha Salas won Mexico's first Mixed Doubles title at the 2022 Pan American Racquetball Championships.

Junior years - Success at World Juniors
Montoya played at the 2013 International Racquetball Federation (IRF) World Junior Championships in Sucre, Bolivia, where he was second in Boys U16, losing the final to fellow Mexican Andree Parrilla, 15-9, 15-11. He also played U16 Doubles there, and won it with Erik Garcia.

Montoya won Boys U18 at World Juniors in 2015 in Santo Domingo, Dominican Republic, by defeating Parrilla in the final, 15-7, 15-11.

Career begins - 2015–2018
Montoya began playing pro racquetball on the World Racquetball Tour (WRT) in 2015. After not getting past the quarterfinals in his first three appearances, Montoya had a breakthrough when he won the 2016 Pleasanton Open, defeating Alejandro Cardona in the final, 6-15, 15-5, 11-1. He also played the US Open for the first time, losing to Kane Waselenchuk the Round of 32, 11-2, 11-5, 11-6.

In 2017, Montoya played 10 WRT tournaments, reaching the final six times and winning thrice. His first final's win was in January at the 2017 Longhorn Open, defeating Javier Mar, 12-15, 15-8, 11-2. He followed that up with a win in February at the Mount Rainier Open, beating David Horn, 15-5, 15-5. His third win came in June, when he defeated Alejandro Landa in the Paola Longoria Challenge, 15-13, 5-15, 11-2.

Montoya played twice on the International Racquetball Tour (IRT) in 2017, and reached the semi-finals in Canoga Park, California, where he beat Alvaro Beltran, 11-8, 12-10, 11-5, in the quarterfinals before losing to Kane Waselenchuk in the semis, 11-1, 11-0, 11-3. In his second US Open, Montoya again reached the Round of 32, and lost to Alejandro Landa but in a tie-breaker, 11-6, 6-11, 11-8, 9-11, 11-9.

Winning gold for Mexico - 2018–present
Montoya began 2018 with a runner up showing at the 2018 WRT Longhorn Open, losing in the final to Jake Bredenbeck, 15-3, 15-11. Then at the 2018 IRT Lewis Drug Pro-Am, he lost to Samuel Murray in the quarterfinals, 15-10, 5-15, 11-5.

Montoya first played for Mexico at the 2018 Pan American Racquetball Championships in Temuco, Chile, where he played both Men’s Singles and Doubles. In singles, he reached the semi-finals before losing to eventual champion Carlos Keller of Bolivia, 15-6, 2-15, 11-4. But he and Alvaro Beltran won Men’s Doubles, defeating Bolivia's Roland Keller and Conrrado Moscoso in the final, 13-15, 15-10, 11-6.

Also in 2018, Montoya played at the 2018 Central American and Caribbean Games in Barranquilla, Colombia, where he lost in the quarterfinals of Men’s Singles to Luis Perez of the Dominican Republic, 15-10, 15-11. But he helped Mexico win gold in the Men’s Team event, including beating Andres Acuña of Costa Rica, 15-10, 15-2, in one of the singles matches in the final.

Montoya wrapped up an internationally successful 2018 by winning Men’s Singles at the IRF World Championships, beating USA's Charlie Pratt in the final, 15-14, 15-9, after defeating USA's David Horn in the semi-finals, 15-9, 15-8, and Bolivia's Conrrado Moscoso in the quarterfinals, 13-15, 15-7, 11-6. It was Montoya’s first World title in his first World Championships appearance.

At the 2018 US Open, he had his career best finish, losing to Mario Mercado in the Round of 16, 6-15, 15-13, 11-5.

Montoya began 2019 with a Round of 16 finish at the IRT's California Open in January, when he lost to Alejandro Landa, 10-15, 15-7, 11-6. But two weeks later, he defeated Landa en route to a semi-final finish in the 41st Annual Lewis Drug IRT Pro-Am in Sioux Falls, South Dakota. There Montoya beat Landa in the Round of 16, 15-8, 9-15, 11-10, Alvaro Beltran in the quarterfinals, 15-12, 15-6, before losing to Daniel De La Rosa in the semi-finals, 15-1, 15-4. He followed that up with another semi-final finish at the Shamrock Shootout in Lombard, Illinois, where Montoya beat De La Rosa in the 16s, 15-3, 15-9, and Beltran in the quarters, 15-8, 15-9, before losing to Rocky Carson in the semis, 15-11, 15-2. Those results helped Montoya finish the 2018-19 IRT season in the top 10 for the first time at #9.

Montoya tried to defend Mexico’s Pan American Men’s Doubles Championship at the 2019 Pan American Racquetball Championships in Barranquilla, Colombia, with Javier Mar, but they lost in the semi-finals to Bolivia's Roland Keller and Conrrado Moscoso, 14-15, 15-11, 11-7.

At the 2019 Pan American Games in Lima, Peru, Montoya won both Men’s Singles and Men’s Doubles. In singles, he defeated fellow Mexican Alvaro Beltran in the final, 9-15, 15-6, 11-0. In the semi-finals, Montoya defeated Bolivia's Conrrado Moscoso, 15-14, 15-10, and in the quarters, beat Canada's Samuel Murray, 15-7, 15-10. In doubles, he and Javier Mar beat Moscoso and Roland Keller, 15-10, 15-1. They defeated USA's Rocky Carson and Charlie Pratt in the semi-finals, 11-15, 15-9, 11-8, and Canada's Coby Iwaasa and Samuel Murray in the quarterfinals, 15-5, 15-6. Despite those two wins, Montoya and his team-mates only reached the semi-finals in the team event in Lima, where they lost to Colombia's Sebastian Franco and Mario Mercado.

Montoya went to the 2021 IRF World Championships in Guatemala City, Guatemala as the defending champion in Men's Singles. However, he was defeated by Costa Rican Andres Acuña in the group stage, 15-5, 15-4, which gave him a low seeding for the medal round. He lost his second medal round match to American Jake Bredenbeck, 15-10, 15-14. Montoya also played Men's Doubles in Guatemala with Javier Mar, and they won gold by defeating Bolivia's Roland Keller and Conrrado Moscoso, 15-10, 15-9, in the final after beating the USA's Alejandro Landa and Charlie Pratt, 15-2, 15-13, in the semi-finals. So, although Montoya failed to defend his title in Men's Singles, he won Men's Doubles, and in doing so became just the third man to win both singles and doubles at Worlds (after USA's Todd O'Neill and Mexico's Alvaro Beltran).

Montoya and Samantha Salas won the first Mixed Doubles Pan American Championship at the 2022 Pan American Racquetball Championships in Santa Cruz de la Sierra, Bolivia. He also was bronze medalist in Men's Singles, and silver medalist in the Men's Team event in Bolivia.

Career summary
Montoya has played seven times for Mexico, and won seven gold medals.

Career record
This table lists Montoya’s results across annual events.

Note: W = winner, F = finalist, SF = semi-finalist, QF = quarterfinalist, 16 = Round of 16. P = pandemic cancelled event.

See also
 List of racquetball players

References

Living people
1996 births
Pan American Games medalists in racquetball
Racquetball players at the 2019 Pan American Games
Pan American Games gold medalists for Mexico
Mexican racquetball players
Competitors at the 2018 Central American and Caribbean Games
Central American and Caribbean Games competitors for Mexico
Central American and Caribbean Games gold medalists for Mexico
Medalists at the 2019 Pan American Games
Competitors at the 2022 World Games
World Games silver medalists